Federico Beltrán Masses (September 8, 1885 – October 4, 1949) was a Spanish painter born in Cuba; the only child of Luis Beltrán Fernández Estepona, a former Spanish army officer stationed in Cuba, and Dona Mercedes Masses Olives, the daughter of a doctor from Lleida, Catalonia, who himself had married the daughter of a wealthy Spanish Cuban-landowner. He spent his youth in Barcelona, where he began his artistic training in the well-regarded Escola de la Llotja. He later moved to Madrid, where he received more training under Joaquín Sorolla. He married Irene Narezo Dragoné, a painter as well, of a distinguished family and good economic position. They moved to Paris in 1916 to further Masses' career and settled there until 1946, after which he moved to Barcelona in 1946 and later died in 1949.

Life and art 

Beltrán Masses was renowned as a master of colour and the psychological portrait, as well as a painter of seductive images of women. Born in Cuba, where his mother’s family had lived for nearly two centuries, his family returned to Spain to live in Barcelona, when he was seven years old. The painter’s Spanish heritage would influence his oeuvre deeply while he sometimes referenced the tropical exoticism of Cuba in the settings for some of his subjects. His paintings are rich with musical and poetic references influenced by "Greek mythology, orphic mysteries and fantasies of Asia, where we are led by Gustave Moreau" remarked Louis Vauxcelles.

Beltrán Masses' connection to the world of music and dance 

A guitar featured recurrently in many of his subject paintings, while his interest in contemporary dance led to his design of the scenery and gypsy costume for a 1929 performance by then celebrated dancer Antonia Mercé “La Argentina” (whose portrait he painted).

An early fascination with Symbolism and "the Ancients" manifest in paintings such as Lackmy and Canción de Bilitis, while his dark paintings of eroticised women, languorously posed in fantastical nocturnal settings set him apart from contemporary artistic trends. His 1915 portrait of a Spanish countess, naked but for a white mantilla, seated between two fully clothed companions (La Maja Marquesa), was publicly denounced and had to be retitled. This decided Beltrán’s move to Paris, where he spent most of the next thirty years. Before his departure a solo exhibition of his work in Madrid in 1916 received the accolade of a visit from the Spanish King, Alfonso XIII;  this was followed by further successes at the XII Venice Biennale of 1920, where an entire pavilion was dedicated to his work, and several large-scale exhibitions in Paris, New York, Palm Beach and London received enthusiastic reviews.

Such was his fame that in 1926 Martha Graham titled a dance at her first public performance in New York "Portrait – Beltrán Masses";  in 1929 the temporary removal from a London exhibition of two particularly explicit paintings led to denunciations of censorship but insured an attendance of over 17,000 paying visitors in just three weeks. Beltrán Masses' portrait subjects included kings and princes, Hollywood stars, and leaders of high society on both sides of the Atlantic, while he was particularly sought out by women who had unashamedly rejected convention and whose lives had sometimes scandalised the public.

Spanish royal support and his move to Paris 

Alfonso XIII’s support and a personal introduction by the Spanish Dowager Queen, Maria Christina of Austria to the Spanish Ambassador, gave Beltrán immediate access to Parisian society. He leased a splendid residence near the Porte de Passy in the 16th arrondissement of Paris, where he established his studio. Here, the coarse Catalan peasants of his youthful canvases gave way to dark eyed gitanas and recumbent majas, wearing costumes that emphasised their feminine and seductive qualities. His paintings of women earned him comparisons with the poetry of Baudelaire and, indeed, he later provided the images for an illustrated edition of Les Fleurs du Mal. The contemporary viewer was struck by his use of colour and the mysterious, nocturnal world in which he set so many of his subjects, while sharply illuminating principal figures. He often painted in a darkened room, using artificial light to emphasize the contrast between bodies and their setting. He places figures against rich fabrics or, following his sojourn in Venice in 1920, in imaginary Venetian settings.

His work as a portraitist became an important source of revenue; European royalty, members of the Spanish, French, Italian and British aristocracy, the wives and lovers of newly rich entrepreneurs and leading actors and dancers all vied for his attention. Despite the artistic revolution led by Beltrán Masses’ Spanish contemporaries Pablo Picasso and Juan Gris, Beltrán never embraced abstract cubism and futurism held no appeal for him. The realist legacy of his teacher Joaquín Sorolla (1863–1923) was subsumed instead by a mystical symbolism distinctly Beltrán Masses’s. In his use of colour and at times exaggerated drawing, Beltrán forged an individual and radical identity which concentrated on the psychological. His work bears superficial comparison with that of his friend Kees van Dongen, who, like Beltrán, captured the escapism that characterised post-First World War society.

Venice, a backdrop to some of his portraits and subject paintings 

Venice, where Beltrán Masses had first met with international fame, became for him the city of his dreams. It provided a dramatic and fantastical background for portraits and subject paintings throughout the 1920s and early 1930s. His famous ‘beltran blue’ casts the city in a romantic perpetual evening in many paintings, their mysterious figures often only party lit while dark shadows exaggerate their features or costumes. The Venice exhibition included several of his best known works, notably his nude Salomé which was later to cause a scandal in London. Beltrán Masses' huge success at the 1920 Venice Biennale was consecrated by the inclusion of his Portrait of the Painter in the gallery of famous painters in the Uffizi leading to a major solo exhibition at the Cercle Interalliée in Paris. Other exhibitions in the French capital were held in succeeding years at the Georges Petit, Bernheim, Charpentier and Jacques Seligman galleries, and at the Galerie Borghese on the Champs-Élysées.

Beltrán Masses enjoyed widespread support among contemporary French critics 

Beltrán Masses benefited from the enthusiastic support of the critics Arsène Alexandre (1859–1937), an early admirer of Rodin and Seurat (Alexandre invented the term pointillism), and Louis Vauxcelles (1870–1945) who had first used the word Fauvism and invented the adjective Cubism. The poet, novelist and critic Camille Mauclair (1872–1945), an advocate for the symbolist movement of the late nineteenth and early twentieth centuries also praised Beltrán Masses. The latter two wrote lengthy introductions to a 1921 illustrated monograph on the artist in which five of the paintings included in this exhibition were reproduced. Arsène Alexandre later wrote the introduction to Beltrán’s illustrations for a 1929 edition of Il Trionfo della Morte (1894) by the renowned Italian poet Gabriele d’Annunzio at the Galerie Javal and Bourdeaux. Critics in Paris and London noted the psychology of Beltrán Masses' artistic vision; indeed in 1931 the Paris Revue de Psychothérapie et de Psychologie Appliquée published a lengthy article entitled "L’Oeuvre Psychologique de Beltran-Masses" by Dr Pierre Vachet, reporting the conclusions of a special conference organised by the French Society of Psychotherapists. The article concentrated particularly on the artist’s use of colour to define the mysterious symbolism of the settings for many of his paintings, while emphasising the sensuality and voluptuous femininity of his subjects.

Success in the United States 

Reports of his fame reached the United States by 1921; a paragraph in American Art News mentions the success of Beltrán Masses' first Paris exhibition. The early twentieth century had seen an explosion of interest in Spanish art, exemplified by John Singer Sargent’s El Jaleo, Isabella Stewart Gardner’s Spanish Cloister gallery (now part of her eponymous museum) to house it. Beltrán Masses was later elected a member of the Hispanic Society of America. In 1924 Beltrán was invited to exhibit at the Wildenstein galleries in New York; more commercially successful exhibitions followed in Palm Beach and the Los Angeles show, both in 1925. Los Angeles was yet to establish a major art museum and such was the excitement generated by the paintings of Federico Beltrán Masses that it was opened with a lengthy musical programme of Spanish and Mexican music and a reception for hundreds of black-tie attired guests. The favourable reviews Beltrán received in America and the praise for the “psychological” insights that he captured brought him a succession of commissions from American East and West Coast society.

Beltrán Masses and Hollywood 

Beltrán Masses’ success in Hollywood and the acquaintances he made through friendship with the actress Marion Davies and her lover of William Randolph Hearst (who purchased four paintings by the artist and whose portrait he painted), helped his career greatly. An astute self-promoter, Beltrán Masses made much of this connection to Hearst, with whom he travelled in Europe. Surviving photographic archive shows Beltrán Masses with Charlie Chaplin, the Hearst newspaper columnist Louella Parsons, the actress Merle Oberon, screen legend Douglas Fairbanks Senior and his son Douglas Fairbanks Junior, Sylvia Ashley, Pola Negri and Gloria Swanson, whom he also painted, among other Hollywood personalities. Beltrán Masses' later connections with French Cinema were cemented by the inclusion of twelve paintings and three drawings in the 1934 film, Le Rosaire, staged by Gaston Ravel and Tony Lekain. Years after Beltrán’s brief time in Hollywood, friends such as Davies, Hearst, Fairbanks and Joan Crawford still visited Beltrán Masses in Paris in the 1930s.

Debut in London 
The immediate success of Beltrán Masses' 1929 exhibition in London at the New Burlington Galleries owed much to the art historian and critic for The Observer and Daily Mail, Paul George Konody  (1872–1933), who wrote the introduction to the exhibition catalogue, and reviewed it for the Daily Mail in a one-page article. This exhibition – from which two paintings, the Salomé and The Nights of Eve, were initially removed – was a triumph for the artist: eighteen paintings in the show stayed in England after the exhibition. Despite his evident admiration for the artist, Konody avoided being slavish in his praise. While he complimented the artist on his romantic sensibility and his brilliant use of colour, he was critical of the occasional contradictions in his drawing. Beltrán Masses had a second large scale exhibition in London in the galleries of the Royal Watercolour Society in 1934, but his last public exhibition in London at the New Burlington Galleries in 1938, did not have the same success.

Federico Beltrán Masses was a member of the jury for Miss France 1938.

The Spanish Civil War and the artist's failing health 

The horrors of the Spanish Civil War caused the artist a great distress. Beltrán Masses was instinctively unsympathetic to the republic, believing it had destroyed much that he treasured; the support of the exiled King Alfonso XIII had also been an important factor in Beltrán’s early success. Beltrán Masses was a practising Catholic and a knight of both the Order of Malta and the Order of the Holy Sepulchre who instinctively supported the Nationalists but was equally deeply upset by the tragic consequences of the conflict, having friends on both sides. The artist remained in Paris after the outbreak of the Second World War – as a citizen of a neutral power he was able to live relatively undisturbed by the German occupation. The art market suffered, however, and he had to move to a smaller home, and give painting lessons in his studio there to make ends meet. When ill-health and failing eyesight, which began deteriorating in the mid-1930s, required urgent attention Beltrán and another followed in Madrid, but the painter returned to Paris the following year hoping to resume his career. This proved impossible. Liver disease now compounded his earlier heart problems and on October 4, 1949, Beltrán Masses died, aged just sixty-four. A small posthumous exhibition of his portraits was staged by the Lyceum, Havana, Cuba in 1950, his first monographic exhibition in the country of his birth.

His success, obscurity and then rediscovery 

Beltrán Masses was showered with public honours and was a member of the Academies of San Fernando in Madrid, San Jorge in Barcelona and San Luís in Zaragoza, as well as those of Lisbon, Cordóba and Málaga, and also a member of the French Institut and Académie des Beaux Arts in Paris. That his name was almost forgotten until recently is in part the consequence of changes in taste, figurative painting abandoned by all but a handful of successful contemporary painters from the late 1940s through 1970s. Furthermore, many of the artist’s more important works remained the property of the heirs of his widow, and only when the enthusiastic support of a Barcelona collector resulted in three public exhibitions in Spain (in Salamanca, Barcelona and, in June–July 2012, at the Real Academia de Bellas Artes de San Fernando in Madrid) was Beltrán’s art once again brought to the attention of the Spanish public. Two important paintings in the Musée National d'Art Moderne at the Centre Pompidou and others in the collection of the Reina Sofia, the Civic Museum in Ciudad Real, and the Casa Lis in Salamanca have offered few opportunities to see paintings on public exhibition. When the Cuban Museo Nacional de Bellas Artes de La Habana, reopened in 2000 two large scale works were revealed to a public which had no previous acquaintance with the Cuban-born artist. The recent revival of interest in Beltrán Masses owes much to the care with which his heirs retained not only the paintings they had inherited but an extensive archive, which includes many photographs from the 1920s and 1930s as well as exhibition catalogues, reviews and mementoes.

Stair Sainty Gallery is currently staging an exhibition Federico Beltrán Masses' paintings which runs until March 24, 2016.

A catalogue raisonné of the artist is presently in preparation.

References

External links 

Museum Guide from Casa Lis that includes a depiction of another representation of Salome by Beltrán-Masses

Modern painters
Spanish male painters
20th-century Spanish painters
20th-century Spanish male artists
1885 births
1949 deaths
Burials at Montjuïc Cemetery
Knights of Malta
Knights of the Holy Sepulchre
Spanish people in Spanish Cuba